Henry Man (fl. 1415–1429), of Salisbury, Wiltshire, was an English politician.

He was a Member (MP) of the Parliament of England for Salisbury in 1415, March 1416, 1422, 1425, 1426 and 1429. He was Mayor of Salisbury in 1402.

References

Year of birth missing
Year of death missing
English MPs 1415
People from Salisbury
English MPs March 1416
English MPs 1422
English MPs 1425
English MPs 1426
English MPs 1429
Members of Parliament for Salisbury